JKX may refer to:

The Jamie Kennedy Experiment, an American television show
JKX Oil & Gas, a British exploration and production company